Dante Martin (born March 3, 2001) is an American professional wrestler currently signed to All Elite Wrestling (AEW). He performs alongside his older brother Darius Martin as part of the tag team Top Flight.

Professional wrestling career

Independent circuit (2016–2020) 
Dante Martin along with his brother Darius received his training from The Academy: School Of Professional Wrestling in Minnesota by Ken Anderson and they made their professional wrestling debut in 2016 as the tag team Top Flight.

Prior to AEW, Martin wrestled for Ireland’s Over the Top Wrestling, AAW Wrestling based in Illinois, Game Changer Wrestling, and Black Label Pro.

All Elite Wrestling (2020–present) 
On the October 27, 2020, episode of AEW Dark, Top Flight made their All Elite Wrestling (AEW) debut where they lost to Evil Uno and Stu Grayson of The Dark Order. On the November 18 episode of AEW Dynamite, Top Flight fought The Young Bucks in a losing effort. On November 23, it was announced that they had signed with the company. In February 2021, Darius was sidelined with a torn ACL thus taking him out of action and leaving Dante on his own as a singles competitor. Over the following months, Martin would receive a significant push wrestling against the likes of Kenny Omega, Malakai Black, Matt Sydal, and Powerhouse Hobbs. In October 2021, Martin formed an alliance with Lio Rush who was attempting to recruit him as his tag team partner. On the November 11, 2021, episode of AEW Dynamite, Martin teamed with Rush against Matt Sydal and Lee Moriarty where they were victorious. On the November 24 episode of AEW Dynamite, Martin accepted Taz's offer to join Team Taz much to Rush's dismay. However, on the December 8 episode of Dynamite, Martin would eliminate Team Taz member Ricky Starks from the Dynamite Diamond Dozen Battle Royal, thus winning the battle royal and removing him from the group. It was revealed that Dante joining Team Taz was a scheme created by Lio Rush and Dante Martin. The following week, Martin fought MJF for the Dynamite Diamond Ring where he lost after a distraction by Starks. The partnership between Rush and Martin would abruptly end after Rush departed AEW. On the January 12th episode of Dynamite, Dante Martin defeated Powerhouse Hobbs. On the February 18, 2022, episode of AEW Rampage, Martin fought Hobbs in a Face of the Revolution Qualifying match where he was defeated. Three weeks later on the March 2nd episode of Dynamite, Dante reunited with his brother Darius in the tag team Casino Battle Royal, where Darius would last until the end, with Darius being eliminated by Matt Jackson of The Young Bucks. On the March 9 episode of Dynamite, Martin challenged Hangman Page for the AEW World Championship in a losing effort. After the match, Martin was endorsed by Page as a future champion in AEW as both men embraced and shook hands. The return to action was short-lived as soon after it was revealed that Darius had gotten into a serious car accident, which was expected to leave him out injured for up to nine months, forcing Dante to return to singles competition. On May 4, Dante lost to Rey Fenix in an Owen Hart Cup tournament qualifying-round match. On June 3, Dante faced Scorpio Sky for the AEW TNT Championship, but was defeated.  On August 12 on AEW Rampage Quake by the Lake, Martin teamed up with Skye Blue to take on Sammy Guevara and Tay Melo for the AAA World Mixed Tag Team Championship which they lost. On September 4, at All Out (2022), Dante competed in the Casino Ladder match, but the match was won by Maxwell Jacob Friedman.

On November 16, Dante reunited with a returning Darius to team with AR Fox, to challenge Death Triangle, for the AEW World Trios Championships, in a losing effort. On the November 13 edition of Rampage, Top Flight unsuccessfully challenged FTR, for the ROH World Tag Team Championships. On December 10, at Final Battle, Top Flight made their debuts for AEW's sister company Ring of Honor, defeating The Kingdom on the pre-show. On the December 23 edition of Rampage, Top Flight once again teamed with AR Fox, where they won the 300.000 Dollar Three Kings Christmas Casino Trios Battle Royal, where the brothers lastly eliminated ROH World Champion, Claudio Castagnoli. Due to this, Top Flight entered a short feud with the Blackpool Combat Club, in which Castagnoli was a member, losing to members of the group over the following weeks. Top Flight achieved their first win over the BBC on the January 16 edition of AEW Dark, defeating Castangnoli and Wheeler Yuta, in a 3-way tag-team match also involving, The Butcher and the Blade, after Dante pinned The Blade. On the January 18 edition of Dynamite, Top Flight defeated The Young Bucks, in an upset victory.

Personal life 
As of 2022, Dante was dating fellow AEW wrestler Skye Blue.

Championships and accomplishments
 All Elite Wrestling
 Casino Trios Royale (2022 - with Darius Martin and AR Fox)
 Dynamite Award (1 time)
 Best High Flyer (2022)
 American Wrestling Federation
 AWF Championship (1 time)
 AWF Television Championship (1 time)
 AWF Television Championship Tournament (2019)
 Canadian Wrestling Elite
 CWE Canadian Unified Junior Heavyweight Championship (1 time)
 Glory Pro Wrestling
 United Glory Tag Team Championship (1 time) - with Air Wolf
 Independent Wrestling International
 IWI Tag Team Championship (1 time) - with Air Wolf
 Pro Wrestling Battleground
 PWB Breakout Championship (1 time)
Pro Wrestling Illustrated
 Ranked No. 127 of the top 500 singles wrestlers in the PWI 500 in 2022

References

2001 births
Living people
21st-century professional wrestlers
All Elite Wrestling personnel
American male professional wrestlers
African-American male professional wrestlers
Professional wrestlers from Minnesota
21st-century African-American sportspeople